Hypenia is a genus of flowering plants in the mint family, Lamiaceae, first described as a genus in 1988. It is native to South America and southern Mexico.

Species
Hypenia aristulata (Epling) Harley - Goiás
Hypenia brachystachys (Pohl ex Benth.) Harley - southern Brazil
Hypenia calycina (Pohl ex Benth.) Harley - Brazil
Hypenia concinna (Benth.) Harley - Tocantins
Hypenia crispata (Pohl ex Benth.) Harley - Goiás
Hypenia densiflora (Pohl ex Benth.) Harley - Brazil
Hypenia durifolia (Epling) Harley - Brazil
Hypenia gardneriana (Benth.) Harley - Brazil
Hypenia glauca (A.St.-Hil. ex Benth.) Harley - Brazil, Paraguay
Hypenia inelegans (Epling) Harley - Brazil
Hypenia irregularis (Benth.) Harley - Brazil
Hypenia macrantha (A.St.-Hil. ex Benth.) Harley - Brazil
Hypenia macrosiphon (Briq.) Harley - Brazil, Paraguay, Bolivia
Hypenia marifolia (Benth.) Harley - Brazil
Hypenia micrantha (Benth.) Harley - Mato Grosso
Hypenia paniculata (Benth.) Harley - Brazil
Hypenia paradisi (Harley) Harley - Goiás
Hypenia pauliana (Epling) Harley - Brazil
Hypenia perplexa (Epling) Harley - Brazil
Hypenia pruinosa (Pohl ex Benth.) Harley - Brazil
Hypenia reticulata (Mart. ex Benth.) Harley - eastern Brazil
Hypenia salzmannii (Benth.) Harley - Brazil, Guyana, Venezuela
Hypenia simplex (A.St.-Hil. ex Benth.) Harley & J.F.B.Pastore - Brazil
Hypenia subrosea (Harley) Harley - Goiás
Hypenia violacea Mart.Gord. & S.Valencia - Guerrero, Oaxaca

References

Lamiaceae
Lamiaceae genera